Pillars of the Sky is a 1956 American CinemaScope Western film directed by George Marshall and starring Jeff Chandler and Dorothy Malone.

Plot
Oregon Country 1868: Indians of many tribes trust Sgt. Emmett Bell, who rides into Dr. Joseph Holden's mission with his Indian scouts. However, troop and weapon movements by new U.S. Cavalry commanding officer Col. Steadlow have endangered the peace and angered the chiefs, in particular one called Kamiakin. An outraged Bell tries to appeal to Steadlow as well as Capt. Tom Gaxton, whose wife Calla was once in love with him. Calla and another woman are taken captive but are rescued by Bell, rekindling his and Calla's romance.

The Indians ambush a large cavalry patrol and, after a fierce fightwith extensive dead and wounded on both sidesthe surviving soldiers break through the Indians and manage to escape to Holden's mission, using it as a fortification against an expected attack. Appeals for a truce go in vain. However, a particularly bloodthirsty act by Kamiakin results in his being killed by one of his own, whereupon Bell and the chiefs agree to do whatever is necessary to restore the peace.

Cast

 Jeff Chandler as First Sergeant Emmett Bell 
 Dorothy Malone as Calla Gaxton
 Ward Bond as Doctor Joseph Holden
 Keith Andes as Captain Tom Gaxton
 Lee Marvin as Sergeant Lloyd Carracart
 Sydney Chaplin as Timothy
 Willis Bouchey as Colonel Edson Stedlow
 Michael Ansara as Kamiakin
 Olive Carey as Mrs. Anne Avery
 Charles Horvath as Sergeant Dutch Williams
 Orlando Rodriguez as Malachi
 Glen Kramer as Lieutenant Winston 
 Floyd Simmons as Lieutenant Hammond
 Pat Hogan as Jacob
 Felix Noriego as Lucas
 Paul Smith as Morgan
 Martin Milner as Waco
 Robert Ellis as Albie
 Ralph Votrian as Music (as Ralph J Votrian)
 Walter Coy as Major Donahue
 Alberto Morin as Sgt. Major Frenchy Desmonde
 Richard Hale as Isaiah
 Frank Kova as Zachariah (as Frank de Kova)
 Terry Wilson as Captain Fanning
 Philip Kieffer as Major Randall
 Gilbert Conner as Elijah

Production
The film was partly shot on location in Oregon over six weeks. At one stage it was announced the film was going to be directed by John Ford and star John Wayne.

Filming started August 1955.

Evaluation in film guides
Leonard Maltin's Movie Guide gives Pillars of the Sky 2½ stars (out of 4) in a one-sentence write-up which states that "Chandler is apt as swaggering army officer...", with Steven H. Scheuer's Movies on TV also arriving at the 2½ stars (out of 4) rating, deciding that "Western fans will buy this tale of a no-account, hard-drinking, woman-chasing Sgt. who finally sees the error of his ways..."

The Motion Picture Guide makes it unanimous (among the three cited sources), with its 2½-star (out of 5) description of the production as "a relatively satisfying cowboys and Indians film starring Chandler as a cavalry scout who is literally a voice in the wilderness..." and, in conclusion, adds, "[G]ood cast. The outdoor location shooting was done in Oregon".

See also
 List of American films of 1956

References

External links
 
 
 
 
 
 Review of film at Variety
 Pillars of the Sky at TV Guide (1987 write-up was originally published in The Motion Picture Guide)

1956 films
1956 Western (genre) films
American Western (genre) films
Films based on works by Henry Wilson Allen
Films directed by George Marshall
Films scored by Heinz Roemheld
Films scored by William Lava
Films set in 1868
Films set in Oregon
Films shot in Oregon
Universal Pictures films
Western (genre) cavalry films
1950s English-language films
1950s American films